Chang Yong-ok is a former international table tennis player from North Korea.

Table tennis career
She won a bronze medal for North Korea at the 1983 World Table Tennis Championships in the Corbillon Cup (women's team event) with Li Song Suk, Kim Gyong-sun and Li Bun-Hui.

She also won two Asian Games medals.

See also
 List of World Table Tennis Championships medalists

References

North Korean female table tennis players
Asian Games medalists in table tennis
Table tennis players at the 1982 Asian Games
Medalists at the 1982 Asian Games
Asian Games bronze medalists for North Korea
World Table Tennis Championships medalists
20th-century North Korean women